Claire Elizabeth Sterk  is a Dutch scientist and former President Emerita and Charles Howard Candler Professor of Public Health at Emory University. Sterk held faculty positions in anthropology, sociology, and women's, gender, and sexuality studies at Emory. She retired in August 2020 after four years as president of Emory University.

Research 
Sterk has been Charles Howard Candler Professor of Public Health at Emory since 2000. Sterk is a leading figure in both public health and anthropology studying addiction, mental health, and HIV/AIDS. She was the first person to identify the risk of HIV infection due to unprotected sex among crack cocaine users.

Sterk received a PhD in sociology from Erasmus University in Rotterdam and her doctorandus degree in medical anthropology from the University of Utrecht. Her undergraduate degree is from the Free University in Amsterdam.

Sterk is the author of two books—Fast Lives: Women Who Use Crack Cocaine and Tricking and Tripping: Prostitution in the Era of AIDS. She has since written another book. She has also published more than 100 articles and book chapters.

She became President of Emory on September 1, 2016. Prior to that time, she had served as provost and executive vice president for academic affairs. She held the position of president in the Alcohol, Drug, and Tobacco section of the American Sociological Association. Sterk is the principal investigator of Building Interdisciplinary Research Careers in Women's Health, which is funded by the Eunice Kennedy Shriver National Institute of Child Health and Human Development.

In November 2019, Sterk announced that she would resign as Emory president at the end of the 2019–2020 school year and return to teaching in the Rollins School of Public Health.

Sterk speaks four languages.

Honors and awards
She was elected to the National Academy of Medicine in 2018   and elected as a fellow of the American Academy of Arts and Sciences in 2019.

References

External links
Emory University, Center for AIDS Research Claire E. Sterk bio

1957 births
Living people
Dutch sociologists
Dutch anthropologists
Dutch women sociologists
Dutch women anthropologists
Medical anthropologists
Emory University people
HIV/AIDS researchers
Dutch women scientists
Erasmus University Rotterdam alumni
Utrecht University alumni
People from Kerkrade
Presidents of Emory University
20th-century women scientists
21st-century women scientists
Women heads of universities and colleges
Members of the National Academy of Medicine